The South Dakota Arts Council, established in 1966, is funded by the state of South Dakota and the National Endowment for the Arts. It seeks to "makes quality arts accessible throughout the state by providing grants, services and information to artists, arts organizations, schools and the public." The Governor of South Dakota appoints its board members.

The Council sponsored apprenticeships in the arts during the 2000s.

References

Arts councils of the United States
Art in South Dakota
Government agencies established in 1966
1966 establishments in South Dakota